is a single by a Japanese American singer Kylee. This single includes 3 songs: "Kimi ga Iru Kara", "On My Own" & "She Wishes". All songs are used in the film Memoirs of a Teenage Amnesiac and "Kimi ga Iru Kara" is also the theme song.

Release history

Track listing
CD single

Personnel

"Kimi ga Iru Kara"
vocals : Kylee
sound produce & all other instruments : CHOKKAKU
vocal arrangement & direction : Naohisa Taniguchi
mix : D.O.I

"On My Own"
vocals : Kylee
guitar : masasucks
bass : Chris Chaney
drums : Scott Garrett
produce : Jeff Turzo
engineering & additional production : Jesse Astin
mix : Sean Beavan

"She Wishes"
vocals : Kylee
all instruments : nature living
vocal direction : Naohisa Taniguchi
mix : Eric Westfall

Music video
The music video for "Kimi ga Iru Kara" was filmed in Los Angeles.

References

External links
  by DefStar Records

2010 singles
2010 songs
Japanese film songs
Defstar Records singles